Michelle Boulle-Rodríguez is a former French-Chilean professional tennis player.

When she started her career she was known as Michelle Boulle and represented France, then married tennis player Patricio Rodríguez in 1966 and became a naturalised Chilean.

Rodríguez played three ties for the Chile Federation Cup team, one in 1968 and another two in 1974. She won all three of her singles rubbers and lost all three doubles matches that she played.

During her career, she featured in the main draws of all four grand slam tournaments. Most of her singles appearances came in the 1960s, and from the 1970s, she primarily played doubles.

References

External links
 
 

Year of birth missing (living people)
Living people
French female tennis players
Chilean female tennis players
French emigrants to Chile
Naturalized citizens of Chile